Western law comprises the legal traditions of Western culture, with roots in Roman law and canon law.  As Western culture shares a Graeco-Roman Classical and Renaissance cultural influence, so do its legal systems.

History
The rediscovery of the Justinian Code in the early 10th century rekindled a passion for the discipline of law, initially shared across many of the re-forming boundaries between East and West. Eventually, it was only in the Catholic or Frankish west that Roman law became the foundation of all legal concepts and systems. Its influence can be traced to this day in all Western legal systems, although differing in kind  and degree between the common (Anglo-American) and the civil (continental European) legal traditions.  

The study of canon law, the legal system of the Catholic Church, fused with that of Roman law to form the basis for the refounding of Western legal scholarship. It was the first modern Western legal system and is the oldest continuously functioning legal system in the West. Its principles of civil rights, equality before the law, equality of women,  procedural justice, and democracy as the ideal form of society formed the basis of modern Western culture.

Western legal culture
Western culture, sometimes equated with Western civilization, Western lifestyle or European civilization, is a term used very broadly to a heritage of social norms, ethical values, traditional customs, belief systems, political systems, and specific artifacts and technologies that have some origin or association with Europe. 

Western legal culture is unified in the systematic reliance on legal constructs. Such constructs include corporations, contracts, estates, rights and powers to name a few. These concepts are not only nonexistent in primitive or traditional legal systems but they can also be  which form the basis of such legal cultures.<ref
  name=    "Smith"
>J.C. Smith (1968)
 'The Unique Nature of the Concepts of Western Law'
 The Canadian Bar Review
  (46: 2 pp. 191-225)
  in Csaba Varga (ed) (1992)
  Comparative Legal Cultures
  (Dartmouth: England).</ref
> 

As a general proposition, the concept of legal culture depends on language and symbols and any attempt to analyse non western legal systems in terms of categories of modern western law can result in distortion attributable to differences in language.<ref
  name="Smith"
/> So while legal constructs are unique to classical Roman, modern civil and common law cultures, legal concepts or primitive and archaic law get their meaning from sensed experience based on facts as opposed to theory or abstract. Legal culture therefore in the former group is influenced by academics, learned members of the profession and historically, philosophers. The latter group's culture is harnessed by beliefs, values and religion at a foundation level.

See also
Legal systems of the world
Legal culture
Byzantine law
Canon law
Germanic law
Roman law
Western culture

References

Western culture
Comparative law